Mărdărescu is a Romanian surname. Notable people with the surname include:

Gheorghe Mărdărescu
Gil Mărdărescu (born 1952), Romanian-American footballer
Virgil Mărdărescu (1921–2003), Romanian football manager, father of Gil

Romanian-language surnames